Mount Ward is a small summit in Marlboro, Massachusetts. The summit is located in Marlboro State Forest and the top can be reached via the Mount Ward Trail, a 1.2 mile loop accessible year round.

Marlborough, Massachusetts
Mountains of Middlesex County, Massachusetts
Ward